The 2015 Big 12 Conference women's soccer season was the 20th season of women's varsity soccer in the conference.

The West Virginia Mountaineers claimed their fourth consecutive outright regular season championship, becoming the first time in Big 12 history to do so. The Texas Tech Red Raiders won their first Big 12 tournament title with a 1–0 victory over the Kansas Jayhawks in the final.

Teams

Stadia and locations

Regular season

Rankings

Postseason

Big 12 tournament

Texas Tech claimed its first Big 12 tournament championship in 2015. Following an overtime win over Oklahoma, the Red Raiders eliminated the two-time defending tournament champions West Virginia, 1–0. Texas Tech outlasted Kansas in the final by the same score, claiming the league's automatic berth to the NCAA tournament.

NCAA tournament

All-Big 12 awards and teams

See also 
 2015 NCAA Division I women's soccer season
 2015 Big 12 Conference Women's Soccer Tournament

References 

 
2015 NCAA Division I women's soccer season